Peter MacGregor Pagan (24 July 1921 – 2 June 1999) was an Australian-American actor from Sydney best known for his role in The Overlanders (1946).

Following the success of that film, he left Australia for Britain, then moved to the U.S. where he worked extensively in theatre and TV.

He became a U.S. citizen in 1954. He died in New York City, age 77.

Career
Pagan was born in Sydney, one of three sons. His family moved to Hay, where his father was the town surveyor. He boarded at Scots College, Bellevue Hill. His brother was Brigadier Sir John (Jock) Ernest Pagan, CMG MBE (1914–1986), federal president of the Liberal Party of Australia and NSW agent-general for New South Wales in London.

When 16 he joined an amateur group at Bryant's Playhouse, Forbes Street, Darlinghurst, and studied drama there for four years.

Pagan joined the AIF at 21, and served over three years with an armoured division in Western Australia and was discharged on medical grounds in 1945.

He was cast in The Overlanders. He went to London and then New York.

When he was 27, Pagan joined the Barter Theatre Company in Virginia.

He was awarded the Drama Critics' Award for best supporting actor in 1971 for his role in There's a Girl in My Soup opposite Van Johnson.

In the mid 70s Pagan said, "I'm not interested in Broadway anymore - the critics are killing it." In the late '70s and '80s, Pagan divided his time between New York and Sydney.

Select film & TV credits
The Overlanders (1946) – film
Academy Theatre – episode "Drums of Oude" (1949)
The Philco-Goodyear Television Playhouse – episode "The Lonely" (1949)
The Web – episode "Wanted, Someone Innocent" (1951)
Studio One in Hollywood (1951) – episode "Mr Mummery's Suspicion"
Robert Montgomery Presents – episode "The Sheffield Story" (1952)
Guiding Light (1952)
The Legend of Josiah Blow (1952)
Home Is the Sailor (1953)
Robert Montgomery Presents – episode "Our Hearts Were Young and Gay" (1954)
I Spy – episode "The Green Coat" (1955)
Kraft Theatre – episode "A Night to Remember" (1956)
Playwrights '56 – episode "Keyhole" (1956)
9½ Weeks (1986)

Theatre Credits
Another Language, Criterion Theatre, North Sydney, NSW, 18 March 1939
The Truth About Blayds, St James' Hall , Sydney, NSW, 3 May 1939
The Family Dictator, Criterion Theatre, North Sydney, NSW, June–July 1939
Spring Tide, Minerva Theatre, Kings Cross, NSW, 19 June 1941
It's a Wise Child, Theatre Royal , Sydney, NSW, 1944
Charley's Aunt, Victoria Theatre, Newcastle, NSW, 1946
Dangerous Corner by J Priestley - Virginia (1950)
Escapade by Roger MacDougall - 48th Street Theatre New York - with Carroll Baker, Brian Aherne and Roddy McDowall - (Nov 18, 1953 - Nov 28, 1953)
Portrait of a Lady by William Archibald directed by Jose Quintero - ANTA Playhouse New York - with Jennifer Jones- Dec 21, 1954 - Dec 25, 1954
Child of Fortune by Guy Bolton based on Wings of a Dove - directed by Jed Harris with Edmond Purdom - Royale Theatre, New York - (Nov 13, 1956 - Dec 01, 1956)
13 Daughters - musical with Don Ameche - 54th Street Theatre, New York (Mar 02, 1961 - Mar 25, 1961)
The Vinegar Tree - Cape Playhouse in Dennis, Massachusetts with Faye Emerson (1962)
The Girl Who Came to Supper by Noël Coward - Broadway Theatre, New York - with Florence Henderson and Jose Ferrer - (Dec 08, 1963 - Mar 14, 1964_
Hostile Witness by Jack Roffey - Music Box Theatre, New York - with Ray Milland - (Feb 17, 1966 - Jul 02, 1966
Boeing Boeing at the Cape Playhouse in Dennis, Massachusetts with Van Johnson (1970)
You Never Can Tell by George Bernard Shaw - Philadelphia (1980)
Aren't We All? by Fredrick Lonsdale - Brooks Atkinson Theatre, New York - with Claudette Colbert, Rex Harrison and Lynn Redgrave - (Apr 29, 1985 - Jul 21, 1985)

References

External links

Peter Pagan at Ausstage
Peter Pagan at IBDB

Australian male film actors
1921 births
1999 deaths
20th-century Australian male actors
Male actors from Sydney
Australian emigrants to the United States
Male actors from New York City